Louise Mary Taylor (born  1965) is an American businesswoman and entrepreneur. Taylor became a public figure in January 2008, acting as singer Britney Spears' family spokesperson amid Dr. Phil's alleged violation of trust in a family intervention. Taylor served as Spears's business manager from 2008–2020 and has been credited by Spears as the person who established her conservatorship.

Career
Taylor is a CEO of Tri Star Sports and Entertainment Group, which she established in 1992. Her clients for Tri Star include Jamie Lynn Spears, Steven Tyler, Mary J. Blige, Gwen Stefani, Priyanka Chopra, Meghan Trainor, among others. Her former clients are Britney Spears and Niki Taylor. A Hollywood Reporter article paid for by Spears's estate refers to Taylor as "redefining what business management means in the 21st century."

In the 2010s, Taylor established further connections as she was working for Spears. On the Tri Star roster, she obtained Florida Georgia Line, Reba McEntire, and Jason Derulo as clients.

Work with Britney Spears

Spears's mother, Lynne, wrote in her 2008 memoir Through the Storm that Taylor and Spears's father, Jamie, had a discussion in 2007 about putting Britney under a conservatorship. "Jamie was going to file for the conservatorship on January 22... but he and his business manager, Lou, felt God leading them to wait, fast and pray, despite the frustration of a phalanx of lawyers." Days before Jamie went to court in 2008 to put Spears under a conservatorship, he received a loan of at least $40,000 from Tri Star.

After the conservatorship was put in place, Taylor was officially hired by Jamie as Spears's business manager leading up to the singer's Circus Tour. Taylor's role became more prominent in the media following an ongoing conservatorship dispute between Spears and her father. In November 2021, Spears credited Taylor for establishing her conservatorship.

Taylor was party to a lawsuit in 2011 against Spears's estate, in which Brand Sense Partners, a licensing firm, claimed that the estate breached its contract with Elizabeth Arden, Inc.

#FreeBritney controversy

Taylor came to further prominence in 2019 with the rise of a movement to terminate Spears's conservatorship, dubbed #FreeBritney.

During a May 2019 hearing, Judge Brenda J. Penny ordered "an expert evaluation" of the conservatorship.

In 2019, Taylor was accused by supporters of the #FreeBritney movement of exploiting Spears's finances, a claim she alleged to be defamation, orchestrated by Spears's former manager, Sam Lutfi. Lutfi also accused Taylor of masterminding the conservatorship, and leaked alleged 2007 emails implicating her as a "stalker". Spears's Instagram account posted a video of her, inside a wellness centre, previously reported as voluntary. She asked for privacy; the caption declared Lufti had created the emails, with private photos of Taylor and her husband. The lawsuit was dismissed. Amid the controversy, comments by Taylor's client, Mary J. Blige, resurfaced; she revealed in 2017 that she owed $6.5 million in unpaid back taxes for the years 2008–2016.

A August 19, 2020 hearing to discuss Spears's conservatorship was closed to the public. A court filing from the closed hearing revealed that Spears's sister, Jamie Lynn, was secretly named the trustee of her estate back in 2018. This resurfaced as Spears's court-appointed attorney, Samuel D. Ingham III, asked for a new qualified corporate fiduciary to manage her estate. The documents of Spears's trust were amended, signed off by her co-conservators Jamie and Andrew Wallet. According to The Blast, Spears had set up the trust back in 2004 "to protect her vast fortune and provide for her children's financial future." LA Times reported that Jamie Lynn's August 2020 court filing asks that all assets from the trust be moved into "one or more accounts with Fidelity Brokerage Services with her as the custodian" with Jamie Lynn choosing Stonebridge.

On February 23, 2022, Spears alleged that Taylor invited her into her office at Tri Star a week before she was sent away to a health facility against her will. Spears also promised to sue Taylor and her company Tri Star.

References

External links

1965 births
Living people
People from New York (state)
American businesspeople
American women in business
Britney Spears